Broughton Mills is a village in Cumbria, England, located 3.5 kilometres from the larger town of Broughton-in-furness. The village consists of about 40 households, a phonebox (non-functional), church and a pub called the Blacksmiths Arms.

History 
Broughton mills was formally the place where the people of Broughton-in-furness came to grind their corn, saw their timber, weave their cloth, malt their barley and burn lime. There was formally a wool mill which later became a bobbin mill, a corn mill and a flax mill built along the River Lickle along with quarries, mines, bloomeries, charcoal burners, joiner's shop and a smithy, hatter, weaver and clogger.

See also

Listed buildings in Broughton West
Listed buildings in Dunnerdale-with-Seathwaite

References

External links

Villages in Cumbria
South Lakeland District